This is a list of public holidays observed in Austria.

An asterisk (*) denotes a movable holiday.

Additional days are observed in some states or industries. Below are holidays observed in some federal states.

References

 
Austria
Austrian culture
Holidays